Brookeborough railway station first opened by the Clogher Valley Railway, which is a three foot gauge line.  It opened in May 1887 and closed on 1 January 1942 (with the last trains running the previous day).
The station is in the village of Brookeborough, in County Fermanagh, Northern Ireland.

References

Railway stations opened in 1887
Railway stations closed in 1942
Railway stations in Northern Ireland opened in the 19th century